William Henry Luick Farmhouse is a historic home located in Muncie, Delaware County, Indiana. It was built in 1882, and is a two-story, three bay, Italianate style brick dwelling. It has a limestone faced fieldstone foundation, reconstructed full-width front porch, and round arch windows.

It was added to the National Register of Historic Places in 1994.

References

Houses on the National Register of Historic Places in Indiana
Italianate architecture in Indiana
Houses completed in 1882
Houses in Muncie, Indiana
National Register of Historic Places in Muncie, Indiana